Kamanjab is a constituency in the Kunene Region of Namibia. In 2004, the population was 6,012. , it has 4,862 registered voters. The district capital is the settlement of Kamanjab.

Politics

Until 2015 the constituency was represented by Themistokles Dudu Murorua of the United Democratic Front (UDF). In the 2015 regional election the candidate of the SWAPO party, Angenesia Tjaritje, won narrowly with 1,164 votes, followed by Nico Somaeb of the UDF with 896 votes. The UDF candidate Somaeb narrowly won the 2020 regional election with 1,116 votes. SWAPO's Nikodemus Amutenya came second with 919 votes.

References 

Constituencies of Kunene Region
States and territories established in 1992
1992 establishments in Namibia